Babino may refer to the following places:

 Babino, Bulgaria
 Babino, Grand'Anse, Haiti
 Babino, Berane Municipality, Montenegro
 Babino, Demir Hisar, a village in Demir Hisar municipality, North Macedonia
 Babino, Podlaskie Voivodeship, Poland
 Babino, Vladimir Oblast, Russia
 Babino, Vologda Oblast, Russia
 Babino, Voronezh Oblast, Russia